The 12973 / 12974 Indore–Jaipur Superfast Express is a Superfast train which runs between  and . It is currently being operated with 12973/12974 train numbers on bi-weekly basis.

Coach composition

The train consists of 21 coaches:

 1 AC First Class
 2 AC II Tier
 4 AC III Tier
 8 Sleepar Class
 4 General Unreserved
 2 End On Generator

Service

12973/Indore–Jaipur Superfast Express has an average speed of 61 km/hr and covers 600 km in 9 hrs 55 mins.

12974/Jaipur–Indore Superfast Express has an average speed of 60 km/hr and covers 600 km in 10 hrs 05 mins.

Route and halts

The important halts of the train are :

Schedule

Traction

After , both trains are hauled by a Bhagat Ki Kothi Diesel Loco Shed-based WDP-4D or WDP-4B or WDP-4 up to Jaipur Junction and vice versa.

References

Rail transport in Madhya Pradesh
Railway services introduced in 1997
Rail transport in Rajasthan
Express trains in India
Transport in Indore
Transport in Jaipur